Zhou Chunxiu (born November 15, 1978 in Sheqi County, Henan) is a Chinese marathon runner.

She competed at the 2008 Olympic Games, finishing the marathon in 3rd place. She placed fourth in the marathon at the 2005 World Championships in Helsinki. She won the marathon gold medal at the 2006 Asian Games in Doha, Qatar. She won the silver medal in the marathon at the 2007 World Championships in Osaka, and won the bronze medal in the marathon at the 2008 Summer Olympics in Beijing, one second behind the silver medalist. She finished fourth at the 2009 World Championships in Berlin.

On April 22, 2007 she won the women's race at the London Marathon for the first time in a time of 2:20:38. In 2010, Zhou took second place at the Seoul International Marathon, finishing behind Amane Gobena with a time of 2:25:01.

Her personal best for the marathon is 2:19:51 hours, a time which she achieved in March 2006 with her win at the Seoul International Marathon. The performance made her the seventh woman in history to surpass the barrier of two hours and twenty minutes in the marathon.

She set a half marathon best of 1:08:59 hours at the 2008 Yangzhou Jianzhen International Half Marathon, winning the race in course record and China all-comers record time.

Achievements

See also
China at the World Championships in Athletics

References

External links

1978 births
Living people
Athletes (track and field) at the 2004 Summer Olympics
Athletes (track and field) at the 2008 Summer Olympics
Chinese female long-distance runners
Chinese female marathon runners
London Marathon female winners
Olympic athletes of China
Olympic bronze medalists for China
People from Sheqi County
Asian Games medalists in athletics (track and field)
Athletes (track and field) at the 2006 Asian Games
Athletes (track and field) at the 2010 Asian Games
World Athletics Championships medalists
Runners from Henan
Medalists at the 2008 Summer Olympics
Olympic bronze medalists in athletics (track and field)
Asian Games gold medalists for China
Medalists at the 2006 Asian Games
Medalists at the 2010 Asian Games